Ashley was a New Zealand electorate situated north of Christchurch. It was in use from 1866 to 1902, and was replaced with the Hurunui electorate.

Population centres
In the 1865 electoral redistribution, the House of Representatives focussed its review of electorates to South Island electorates only, as the Otago Gold Rush had caused significant population growth, and a redistribution of the existing population. Fifteen additional South Island electorates were created, including Ashley, and the number of Members of Parliament was increased by 13 to 70.

The Ashley electorate was formed from a corner of Cheviot electorate, and included the towns of Ashley, Amberley, and Oxford. The electorate's boundaries remained roughly the same until the 1881 election, when it expanded slightly into Kaiapoi electorate and Amberley was returned to Cheviot. In the 1887 election, the electorate expanded westwards into Cheviot's southern tip. In the 1890 election, Cheviot itself was abolished, and the majority of its territory was absorbed into Ashley — to compensate, territory was taken from Ashley in the south and given to Kaiapoi. In the 1893 election, Ashley expanded further north, taking the town of Kaikōura from Wairau electorate, but ceded Oxford to Kaiapoi in the south. In the 1902 election, Ashley was dissolved, being replaced with an electorate called Hurunui, covering much the same area.

History
The first representative was Lancelot Walker, who won the  unopposed. Tancred retired at the end of the parliamentary term in 1870 and was succeeded by John Evans Brown, who won the election against two others. At the 1876 election, Brown was challenged by William Miles Maskell, who had been one of his opponents in 1871, but Brown retained his seat.

For the 1879 election, three candidates contested the election, with William Sefton Moorhouse gaining an absolute majority. The 1881 election was contested by five candidates, with William Fisher Pearson the winner. In the 1884 election, Pearson had a dominant win over one challenger.

Meredith was thus declared elected.

Members of Parliament
Key

Election results

1899 election

1896 election

1893 election

1890 election

1888 by-election

1887 election

1884 election

1881 election

1879 election

1875–1876 election

1871 election

Notes

References

Historical electorates of New Zealand
1865 establishments in New Zealand
1902 disestablishments in New Zealand
Waimakariri District
Politics of Canterbury, New Zealand